Draft Day is a 2014 American sports drama film directed by Ivan Reitman and starring Kevin Costner and Jennifer Garner. The premise revolves around the fictional general manager of the Cleveland Browns (Costner) deciding what to do after his team acquires the number one draft pick in the upcoming National Football League draft.

The film premiered in Los Angeles on April 7, 2014 and was released in the United States on April 11, 2014. It received mixed reviews from critics and was a box office failure grossing only $29 million against its $25 million budget. The film was Reitman's final directorial effort before his death in 2022.

Plot

On the morning of the 2014 NFL Draft, Cleveland Browns general manager Sonny Weaver Jr. must decide how to use the seventh overall pick to improve the team, but he has other problems on his mind. His semi-secret girlfriend Ali Parker, the team's salary cap analyst, is pregnant, and the recent death of Sonny's father causes tension with his mother. Sonny had fired his father, a legendary coach for the Browns which he later admits was for his mother's sake because his father refused to retire even with failing health.

The Seattle Seahawks hold the first overall draft pick, and general manager Tom Michaels offers to trade it to Sonny; this would allow the Browns to draft highly-rated Wisconsin quarterback prospect Bo Callahan. Sonny initially declines, but under orders from team owner Anthony Molina to "make a splash," reluctantly makes the deal, trading away the Browns' first-round draft picks for the current season plus the next two years. The unexpected opportunity to obtain Callahan excites Browns fans, but splits the team's front office and players.

The trade goes public after a tweet by Ohio State linebacker Vontae Mack, who had been Sonny's original choice as first pick. Vontae tells Sonny to re-watch college footage of him and Callahan playing against each other, with Mack coming out on top. Sonny begins to have doubts about Callahan's ability under pressure, and the Browns' investigations also bring Callahan's character into question.

When the draft begins that evening, Sonny agonises over the choice before drafting Vontae Mack at number one. Roger Goodell's announcement of the selection shocks the rest of the league, and disrupts many of their plans for their own picks. Molina is irate and flies back to Cleveland, intent on firing Sonny. Head coach Vince Penn is also incensed and threatens to resign.

Rumors spread about Callahan as other teams avoid selecting him. However, the Seahawks are still in contention to pick Callahan with the seventh pick, and Sonny senses an opportunity. He convinces the rookie general manager of the Jacksonville Jaguars to trade him their pick at six in exchange for the Browns' second-round draft picks for that season plus the next two years. Sonny then calls Michaels; in return for passing on Callahan, Sonny demands his first-round picks back, along with punt returner David Putney. After fraught negotiations, the Seahawks seal the deal and choose Callahan at sixth pick. With his now-restored seventh pick, Sonny appeases Penn and Molina by selecting skilled running back Ray Jennings of Florida State, himself the son of a former Browns player.

Molina and his team celebrate an outstanding draft for the Browns. After the draft party, Sonny reconciles with his mother over his excellent draft performance and her soon-to-be first grandchild.

Cast

Production
When the idea was first made public, the film was to be centered on the Buffalo Bills, but the studio subsequently changed it to the Cleveland Browns because of cheaper production costs in Ohio.

Crowd reactions of fans at the actual 2013 NFL Draft, as well as Cleveland Browns fans at local bars, were filmed. Cameos with real-life NFL figures such as league commissioner Roger Goodell and ESPN sportscaster Chris Berman were filmed before and after the draft took place. The rest of the film began filming on May 8, 2013.

2014 NFL Draft
As in the film, the Cleveland Browns made splashes at the draft, trading up to select quarterback Johnny Manziel with the 22nd pick. The team also made several deals, trading away their fourth pick to the Buffalo Bills but for their ninth pick, as well as their 2015 first round pick. They later traded up to the eighth pick to draft Justin Gilbert. Finally, after watching Manziel drop farther than projected, they again traded up for the 22nd pick. Chris Berman, who played himself in the fictionalized draft, commented at the 2014 NFL Draft that the events surrounding the Cleveland Browns were more exciting than the film. Unlike the film, the Browns selected the much-hyped Heisman Trophy winning quarterback, as opposed to passing on Bo Callahan, the fictionalized first pick favorite.

Marketing
The first poster and trailer for the film were released on December 23, 2013.

Reception

Box office
The film grossed $28.8 million in North America with an additional $604,801 overseas for a worldwide total of $29.5 million, against a budget of $25 million.

The film grossed $9.8 million in its opening weekend, finishing in fourth place at the box office behind Captain America: The Winter Soldier, Rio 2, and Oculus (the latter two also being new releases).

Critical response
On Rotten Tomatoes, the film has an approval rating of 60% based on 162 reviews, with an average rating of 5.9/10. The site's critical consensus reads, "It's perfectly pleasant for sports buffs and Costner fans, but overall, Draft Day lives down to its title by relying too heavily on the sort of by-the-numbers storytelling that only a statistician could love." Metacritic assigned the film a weighted average score of 54 out of 100, based on 33 critics, indicating "mixed or average reviews". Audiences polled by CinemaScore gave the film an average grade of "B+" on an A+ to F scale.

Chicago Sun-Times critic Richard Roeper gave the film a "B", stating the film is "a sentimental, predictable, sometimes implausible but thoroughly entertaining, old-fashioned piece."

On the contrary, Jack Hamilton of Slate was harshly critical. "The 'filmmaking' here consists of making sure the camera is pointed at people who are explaining the film's plot to one another, preferably while they are wearing logos and standing in front of more logos," he wrote. He suggested the NFL's involvement had made the film too upbeat. "[It] isn't so much a movie as a movielike infomercial for the kinder, gentler NFL ... In the wake of labor strife, off-field scandals, and the ongoing CTE (chronic traumatic encephalopathy) crisis, the NFL is doubling down on its fantasy of paternalism, and Draft Day is that fantasy's porn film."

Former Green Bay Packers vice president Andrew Brandt criticized Draft Day as "lacking any true depiction of how an NFL team operates leading up to and during the draft", and less realistic about the business of sports than Jerry Maguire and Moneyball.

The screenplay was the number one script on the 2012 Black List survey of unproduced screenplays and WhatCulture listed it as the 10th best script of the 2010s. It was argued that the script "follows one of the central tenets of screenwriting which is, 'thou shalt make things as hard as possible for your protagonist'". However, it was also stated that "[some] of this high-octane drama was lost in the screen translation, which is a shame, since the script is as good as it gets."

References

External links
 
 
 
 
 
 

2014 films
2010s sports drama films
American sports drama films
American football films
Cleveland Browns
Films directed by Ivan Reitman
Films set in Cleveland
Films shot in Cleveland
Films scored by John Debney
Summit Entertainment films
The Montecito Picture Company films
Lionsgate films
Films produced by Ivan Reitman
2010s English-language films
2010s American films